Niceforonia columbiana is a species of frog in the family Strabomantidae, sometimes known as the Colombian Andes frog. It is endemic to Colombia. It is only known from the holotype, which is now lost. The type locality, "Monte Redondo, Buenavista" on the Cordillera Oriental, is in either Cundinamarca or Meta Department, and is considered questionable by some. It might be a synonym of Leptodactylus hylaedactylus (=Adenomera hylaedactyla).

The type locality is at  asl, probably a cloud forest. This contrasts with the higher-altitude paramo habitats of the other two Niceforonia species. There is habitat loss in the area.

References

columbiana
Amphibians of the Andes
Amphibians of Colombia
Endemic fauna of Colombia
Taxonomy articles created by Polbot
Amphibians described in 1899
Taxobox binomials not recognized by IUCN